Jørgen Karterud (born May 6, 1994) is a Norwegian professional ice hockey player. He is currently playing for Vålerenga of the GET-ligaen.

Karterud made his GET-ligaen debut playing with Vålerenga Ishockey during the 2011–12 GET-ligaen season. He remained with the team until 2016 when he moved to Sweden, playing in the Swedish Hockey League for Linköpings HC and the HockeyAllsvenskan for Västerviks IK.

Career statistics

Regular season and playoffs

International

References

External links
 

1994 births
Living people
Karlskrona HK players
Linköping HC players
Norwegian ice hockey forwards
Sault Ste. Marie Greyhounds players
Vålerenga Ishockey players
Västerviks IK players
HK Poprad players
Ice hockey people from Oslo
Norwegian expatriate ice hockey people
Norwegian expatriate sportspeople in Canada
Norwegian expatriate sportspeople in Sweden
Norwegian expatriate sportspeople in Slovakia
Expatriate ice hockey players in Slovakia
Expatriate ice hockey players in Sweden
Expatriate ice hockey players in Canada